A burgstall is a German term referring to a castle of which so little is left that its appearance cannot effectively be reconstructed. It has no direct equivalent in English, but may be loosely translated as "castle site". Variations in the literature include Burgstelle, Altburgstelle, die Burgställe (plural), Burgstähl (archaic) or abgegangene Burg ("lost castle"). In German castle studies, a burgstall is a castle that has effectively been levelled, whereas a "ruin" (Ruine) still has recognisable remnants of the original castle above the level of the ground.

Definitions 
The word burgstall is of medieval origin and comes from Burg = "castle" and Stelle = "place" or "site" and originally just meant a castle, a castle hill or, later, a small castle. Today it refers to the purported site of a castle that has yet to be confirmed or to a place where a castle once stood, but whose walls have completely or largely been levelled.

Many castles that survive today only as burgställe were slighted in the Middle Ages or left to decay naturally after being attacked and destroyed. But many were also deliberately abandoned as a result, for example, of the roof tax in Austria. Local names often still refer to the fortifications that once stood on these sites and many of them still have visible piles of rubble or recognisable, albeit levelled, courtyards, because they usually occupy relatively inaccessible sites. However many were also used as a "quarry" for nearby buildings and have entirely disappeared. In some instances only the earthworks remain visible above the ground – features such as ditches and ramparts. The result is that burgställe are often only recognisable as uneven terrain and some are only visible in aerial photographs. Today most are protected as heritage monuments.

Usage of burgstall in comparison with a ruin or castle:

 Castle: a castle (Burg) is a fortified complex of buildings with a defensive character, an enceinte and a residential area.
 Ruin: a ruin (Ruine) is castle that is no longer habitable due to at least partial collapse or demolition. There are still some above-ground remains.
 Burgstall: a ruin is usually described as a burgstall if a reconstruction of the building plan and functions of the buildings is no longer possible. However, even a ruin in which remnants of the foundation walls enable some sort of reconstruction, is not considered much more than a burgstall in the technical castle literature. There are no significant above-ground remains.
 Lost castle: a "lost" castle (abgegangene Burg) is one where there are no traces left, which is common in the case of hillside or spur castles, where erosion and landslides have cleared them away. The term also covers castles where the exact historical location is not known.

A large number of castles have not survived in their original form but have simply been incorporated into a later structure, such as an early modern fortress or later modern schloss, where they form elements such as individual wings (often parts of the inner bailey), buildings or part of the fortifications or are simply used for the foundations of newer buildings or creation of garden terraces.

Examples

Czech Republic 
 Burgstall, a hill in South Moravia, former site of a Roman military settlement

Germany 
 Altraderach Castle, Raderach, Baden-Württemberg
 Blankenburg Castle, Essel, Lower Saxony
 Blankenhagen Castle, Grethem, Lower Saxony
 Landsöhr Castle, Bad Boll, Baden-Württemberg
 Burgstall Schlosshügel, Weidenberg, Bavaria
 Uhlenburg,  Essel, Lower Saxony

Lithuania 
 Klaipėda Castle, Klaipėda

Netherlands 
 Bredevoort Castle, Bredevoort, Guelders

Places incorporating the name 
There are numerous villages in Germany and Austria with the name Burgstall, presumably named after a castle site of this nature. Examples include:

Germany 
 Burgstall, Saxony-Anhalt a gemeinde in the Börde district in Saxony-Anhalt.
 Burgstall an der Murr, part of the gemeinde of Burgstetten in Baden-Württemberg

Italy 
 Burgstall, South Tyrol, a municipality in South Tyrol

References

Literature 
 Horst Wolfgang Böhme, Reinhard Friedrich, Barbara Schock-Werner (ed.): Wörterbuch der Burgen, Schlösser und Festungen. Reclam, Stuttgart, 2004, pp. 102/103.

 
Castles by type